Greg Richard Willott (born 13 June 1980) is an English cricketer.  Willott is a left-handed batsman who bowls left-arm fast-medium.  He was born in Stoke-on-Trent, Staffordshire.

Willott made his debut for Staffordshire in the 1999 Minor Counties Championship against Cumberland.  Willott has played Minor counties cricket for Staffordshire from 1999 to present, which has included 29 Minor Counties Championship matches and 26 MCCA Knockout Trophy matches.  In 2001, he made his List A debut against the Worcestershire Cricket Board in the Cheltenham & Gloucester Trophy.  He played a further List A match against Surrey in the 2003 Cheltenham & Gloucester Trophy.  In his 2 List A matches, he took 3 wickets at an average of 22.66, with best figures of 2/47.

References

External links
Greg Willott at ESPNcricinfo
Greg Willott at CricketArchive

1980 births
Living people
Cricketers from Stoke-on-Trent
English cricketers
Staffordshire cricketers